Sara Magdalena Skyttedal (born 6 August 1986) is a Swedish politician of the Christian Democrats party. She was elected Member of the European Parliament in the 2019 European Parliament election in Sweden.

Between 2013 and 2016, she chaired the Young Christian Democrats. From 2016 to 2019, she was a municipal commissioner for Linköping.

Early life and education
Skyttedal studied political science, political economy and history science at Stockholm University. She has also studied rhetoric, Swedish language and law. Skyttedal participated in the beauty pageant Miss Sweden in 2006, where she made the Top 15 in the final. It was her fiancé that sent in an application for her to compete.

Political career

Career in national politics
In September 2002, Skyttedal became a member of the Young Christian Democrats. Since then, she has been chairperson of the Haninge constituance for the party, and ombudsman for district group in Stockholm's municipality. She has been district director for the Christian Democrats for Stockholm and vice chairperson for the party in Haninge.

Skyttedal has a background in municipality politics for Haninge, until 2010 she was first vice chairperson in the adult education and high school board and as well as juryman in Södertörn's court.

At the 2010 general elections in Sweden, she was a replacement at the Haninge City council, a job she was released from in early 2011 when she moved from the municipality. At the 2009 and 2014 elections for the European parliament, Skyttedal was a candidate for her party. At the 2010 general elections she became candidate for the municipality elections in Stockholm. She has also resided in Växjö and was part of the 2014 general election for the Kronoberg constituency.

Skyttedal has been the chairperson of Young Christian Democrats since 11 May 2013 and a member of the Christian Democrats party executive board. She was previously first vice chairperson for the Young Christian Democrats. From May 2011 to May 2015, she was the vice chairperson for the Youth of the European People's Party (YEPP).

In October 2015, Skyttedal became the pivotal factor in the Christian Democrats' decision to pull out of the controversial December Agreement.

In July 2016, Skyttedal announced that she would resign as chairperson for the Young Christian Democrats at the next meeting, to be held in late 2016. On 8 September 2016, she announced that she had gained the office of municipal commissioner in Linköping. In the campaign for the September 2018 election for Linköping city hall, she made her party stand out as the most eager to lower municipal tax, and gained 7.5% of the votes, which compared to 4.8% in the 2014 election was the largest increase of any party.

Member of the European Parliament, 2019–present
In 2018, Skyttedal was elected as the Christian Democrats’ leading candidate for the 2019 European elections. Since becoming a Member of the European Parliament, she has been serving on the Committee on Industry, Research and Energy. In this capacity, she has been leading the committee's work on reforming the European Union Emissions Trading System since 2021.

In addition to her committee assignments, Skyttedal has been part of the Parliament's delegation to the Conference on the Future of Europe since 2021.

References

External links 

1986 births
Living people
Christian Democrats (Sweden) politicians
People from Tyresö Municipality
People from Haninge Municipality
Stockholm University alumni
Christian Democrats (Sweden) MEPs
MEPs for Sweden 2019–2024
21st-century women MEPs for Sweden